Oldeholtwolde is a village in Weststellingwerf in the province of Friesland, the Netherlands. It had a population of around 150 in 2017.

The village was first mentioned in 1320 as Oldeholtwolt, and means "old low-lying wood". Olde (old) has been added to distinguish from Nijeholtwolde. The Dutch Reformed church was destroyed in a storm around 1700. A new church was built in 1875.

In 1840, Oldeholtwolde was home to 149 people.

References

External links

Geography of Weststellingwerf
Populated places in Friesland